Vsevolod Zanko (born 30 July 1995) is a Russian swimmer, born in Moscow. He competed at the 2016 Summer Olympics in Rio de Janeiro.

References

External links

Living people
Olympic swimmers of Russia
Russian male swimmers
Russian male breaststroke swimmers
Swimmers at the 2016 Summer Olympics
1995 births